The discography of Damage, a British boy band, consists of two studio albums and three extended plays.

Discography

Studio albums

Extended plays

Singles

As lead artist

As featured artist

Promotional singles

References

Discographies of British artists
Pop music group discographies